Acompsia fibigeri is a moth of the family Gelechiidae which is endemic to eastern Turkey. The habitat consists of mountainous areas.

The forewings are brown, mottled with yellow brown and some darker scales. The hindwings are grey. Adults have been recorded in mid September.

Etymology
The species is named for Danish lepidopterist Michael Fibiger who collected the type series of the species.

References

Moths described in 2002
Endemic fauna of Turkey
Moths of Asia
Acompsia